The Monk, also known as The Kung Fu Monks, is a 1975 Hong Kong martial arts film written, directed by and starring Dean Shek, who makes his directorial debut.

Cast
Dean Shek as Si-hung
Yen Shi-kwan as Ta-chi
Fung Hak-on as Foon Ying
Eddy Ko as Ban Fong's boss
Shirley Wong as Foon Ying's girl
Wong Pau-kei as Thug
Gordon Liu as Foon Ying's thug
Ho Kei-cheong as Casino manager
Wong Shu-tong as Pickpocket
Anna Ho as Prostitute
Fung Fung as Brothel manager
San Sin as Monk
Wan Leng-kwong as Man chasing pickpocket
Hsu Hsia as Thug
Chan Tik-hak
Tang Tak-cheung as Thug
Lau Kar-wing
Chan Kon
Tam Po
Law Keung
Chai Lam as Gambler
Ho Po-sing
Cheung Chi-ping
Lai Yan
Chan Keung
Chu Kai
Ho Kei-cheong
Chui Fat
Wynn Lau
Lo Wai
Wan Fat
Chik Ngai-hung
Ning Mung

Production
According to an interview by Dean Shek, the film was developed after a time when Lau Kar-leung asked Shek whether he was daring enough to direct a film, to which Shek replied, "If you dare to invest, I dare to direct".

References

External links

The Monk at Hong Kong Cinemagic

1975 films
1975 martial arts films
1975 action films
Hong Kong martial arts films
Hong Kong action films
Kung fu films
Films directed by Dean Shek
1970s Cantonese-language films
 Shaolin Temple in film
1975 directorial debut films
1970s Hong Kong films